Seraphin is a masculine given name, adopted from Latin Serafinus, Greek Serafim (Σεραφειμ, Russian  Серафим), ultimately from the Hebrew word seraph. It may refer to:

 Séraphin (opera), an opera by German composer Wolfgang Rihm
 Séraphin (film), a 1950 Quebec film by Paul Gury
 Séraphin: Heart of Stone (Séraphin: un homme et son péché), a 2002 Quebec film
 Seraphin (Xena), a minor character in Xena: Warrior Princess

People with the given name
 Seraphin, Archbishop of Esztergom (died 1104), Hungarian prelate
 Seraphin of Montegranaro (1540–1604), Italian saint
 Seraphino Antao (born 1937), retired runner from Kenya

People with the surname
 Sanctus Seraphin (1699–c.1758), a financially successful Italian violin maker
 Kevin Séraphin (born 1989), French basketball player who plays in the National Basketball Association

See also
 Serafin (disambiguation)
 Serafina (given name)
 Serafino (disambiguation)
 Séraphine (disambiguation)
 Serapion (disambiguation)

French masculine given names